= Edwige Razafy =

Malagasy photographer (1919–1988)

- Born: 1919
- Died: 22 April 1988 (aged 68–69)
- Occupation: Photographer
- Parent(s): Joseph Razafy

Edwige Razafy (1919 – 22 April 1988) was a Malagasy photographer.

Edwige Razafy was born in 1919, the daughter of the photographer Joseph Razafy, or Razafinatapanea, who ran a photography studio from the family home in the Ampasanisadoda neighborhood of Antananarivo. She began to learn photography from her father at the age of seven.

After her father's death in 1949, she took over the Studio Razafy. She took portraits of the elite of Antananarivo and Senegalese French Army soldiers. She also took photographs for her brother-in-law, Arsène Ramahazomanana, founder of the newspaper Fahaleovantena.

Due to failing health, she closed the Studio Razafy in 1964. Edwige Razafy died on 22 April 1988.
